N. vulgaris may refer to:
 Nitrobacter vulgaris, a rod-shaped, Gram-negative and chemoautotrophic bacterium species
 Novafroneta vulgaris, a spider species in the genus Novafroneta and the family Linyphiidae

Synonyms
 Nicrophorus vulgaris, a synonym for Nicrophorus vespillo, a burying beetle species

See also
 Vulgaris (disambiguation)